Connie Polman Tuin''' (born 10 January 1963) is a Canadian former athlete. She competed in the women's heptathlon at the 1984 Summer Olympics.

References

External links
 
 
 
 
 
 

1963 births
Living people
Athletes (track and field) at the 1984 Summer Olympics
Canadian heptathletes
Olympic track and field athletes of Canada
World Athletics Championships athletes for Canada
Athletes (track and field) at the 1987 Pan American Games
Pan American Games silver medalists for Canada
Pan American Games medalists in athletics (track and field)
Athletes (track and field) at the 1982 Commonwealth Games
Commonwealth Games competitors for Canada
Sportspeople from British Columbia
People from Powell River, British Columbia
Medalists at the 1987 Pan American Games